The Henk Krol List (LHK) is a political party in the Netherlands named after its founder and leader Henk Krol, who had previously led both 50PLUS (50+) and the Party for the Future (PvdT). It had a (formally independent) seat in the House of Representatives as the Member Krol. The party participated in the 2021 Dutch general election on 17 March 2021, but did not win any seats.

Electoral results

House of Representatives

See also 
Pim Fortuyn List
Ratelband List

References 

Political parties in the Netherlands
Conservative parties in the Netherlands
Political parties established in 2020